Madison Brengle was the defending champion, but lost in the second round to Sofia Kenin.

Caty McNally won the title, defeating Anna-Lena Friedsam in the final, 6–3, 6–2.

Seeds

Draw

Finals

Top half

Bottom half

Qualifying

Seeds

Qualifiers

Lucky loser

Qualifying draw

First qualifier

Second qualifier

Third qualifier

Fourth qualifier

References

External Links
Main Draw
Qualifying Draw

Dow Tennis Classic - Singles